The following is a list of islands in the Mediterranean Sea. The two main island countries in the region are Malta and Cyprus, while other countries with islands in the Mediterranean Sea include Italy, France, Greece, Spain, Tunisia, Croatia, and Turkey.

By area

By population (above 200,000)

By country

Albania
 Sazan 
 Kunë
 Ksamil Islands
 Franz Joseph Island
 Zvërnec Islands
 Tongo Island
 Stil Island

Croatia

France 
Corsica
 Lavezzi Islands
Cavallo Island
Frioul archipelago
Lérins Islands
Îles d'Hyères

Greece 

 Crete
 Euboea
 Gavdos

Cyclades

Dodecanese Islands

Ionian Islands

North Aegean islands

Saronic Islands

Sporades Islands

Italy

Notable Italian islands include:

 Calabria
Coreca Reefs
Isola di Dino
San Nicola Arcella
 Campanian Archipelago
 Capri
 Gaiola Island
 Ischia
 Nisida
 Procida
 Sirenuse
 Cheradi Islands
 Gallipoli
 San Paolo Island
 Sant'Andrea Island
 Vivara
 Marano Grado Lagoon
 Barbana
 Isola di Grado
 Ligurian Sea islands
 Bergeggi
 Gallinara
 Pontine Islands
 Gavi
 Ponza
 Palmarola
 Santo Stefano
 Ventotene
 Zannone
 Zannone
 Sardinia
 Asinara
 Sant'Antioco
 San Pietro
 La Maddalena
 Caprera
 Spargi
 Budelli
 Razzoli
 Santo Stefano
 Molara Island
 Tavolara
 Sicily
 Aegadian Islands
 Marettimo
 Favignana
 Levanzo
 Aeolian Islands
 Lipari
 Vulcano
 Filicudi
 Alicudi
 Panarea
 Salina
 Stromboli
 Pantelleria
 Pelagie Islands
 Lampedusa
 Lampione
 Linosa
 Ustica
 Tremiti Islands
 Capraia
 Cretaccio
 Pianosa (di Tremiti)
 San Domino
 San Nicola
 Tuscan Archipelago
 Capraia
 Elba
 Formiche di Grosseto
 Giannutri
 Giglio
 Gorgona
 Meloria
 Montecristo
 Palmaiola
 Pianosa
 Venetian Lagoon islands
 Burano
 Chioggia
 Giudecca
 Isola di San Clemente
 La Certosa
 Lazzaretto Vecchio
 Lido
 Mazzorbo
 Murano
 Pellestrina
 Poveglia
 Sacca Fisola
 San Francesco del Deserto
 San Giorgio in Alga
 San Giorgio Maggiore
 San Lazzaro degli Armeni
 San Marco in Boccalama
 Isola di San Michele
 San Secondo
 San Pietro di Castello
 San Servolo
 Sant'Andrea
 Sant'Angelo della Polvere
 Sant'Elena
 Sant'Erasmo
 Santa Maria della Grazia
 Sottomarina
 Torcello
 Tronchetto
 Venice
 Vignole

Lebanon
Palm Islands

Malta 
 Maltese Islands
 Malta Island
 Gozo
 Comino
 Cominotto
 Filfla
 St Paul's Island
 Manoel Island
 Fungus Rock

Montenegro 
 Sveti Nikola Island
 Sveta Neđelja
 Katič
 Sveti Stefan
 Ada Bojana
 Stari Ulcinj
In Bay of Kotor:
 Mamula
 Prevlaka
 Sveti Marko
 Island of Our Lady of Mercy
 Gospa od Škrpjela
 Sveti Đorđe

Spain 

 Alboran
 Balearic Islands
 Gymnesian Islands
 Majorca
 Menorca
 Cabrera
 Sa Dragonera
 Pityusic (or Pine) Islands
 Es Vedrà
 Formentera
 Eivissa / Ibiza
 S'Espalmador
 Columbretes Islands
 Illa Grossa or Columbret Gran
 La Ferrera
 La Foradada
 El Carallot
 Islas Chafarinas
Isla del Congreso
Isla de Isabel II
Isla del Rey
 Islas Alhucemas
Peñón de Alhucemas
Isla de Tierra
Isla de Mar
 Tabarca
 Illes Medes
 Formigues
 Mazarrón
Isla de Perejil
Isla de Santa Catalina

Syria 
 Arwad

Tunisia 
 Djerba
 Kerkennah Islands
 Chergui
 Gharbi
 Galite Islands
 Zembra
 Kneiss
 Chikly
 Plane Island

Turkey 

The following are some of the most notable Turkish Aegean islands.   See Turkish Aegean islands for a more complete list. 

 Bozcaada or Tenedos
 Burgazada
 Büyükada
 Çatalada
 Cunda Island 
 Fener Ada
 Gemiler Adası
 Gökçeada or Imbros (largest Turkish island)
 Güvercin Island
 Hayırsız Ada
 Hekim Island
 Heybeli Ada
 Iç Ada
 İncir Ada
 Kara Ada
 Kara Ada (Bodrum)
 Kargı Adası
 Kınalıada
 Kizikada

 Küçük Tavşan Adası
 Lale Island
 Metalik Ada
 Salih Ada
 Yassi Ada
 Yılancık Ada
 Uzunada

The following are some of the most notable Turkish islands in the Mediterranean.  See Turkish Mediterranean islands for a more complete list.

 Aydıncık Islands
 Babadıl Islands
 Beşadalar
 Boğsak Island
 Boğsak Islet
 Bozyazı Island
 Dana Adası
 Domuz Island
 Gemiler Island
 Kekova
 Kizkalesi
 Sıçan Adası
 Tersane Island
 Yumurtalık Island

Disputed 
 Imia/Kardak (Greece/Turkey)

Politically divided 

 Cyprus (island)
 Republic of Cyprus
 Akrotiri and Dhekelia (Sovereign Base Areas of the United Kingdom)
 Turkish Republic of Northern Cyprus (A de facto state only recognized by Turkey, separated from the Republic of Cyprus by a UN buffer zone)

See also
Adriatic islands
Aegean Islands
Ionian Islands

Notes

References

External links
 
 
 

Mediterranean
Atlantic Ocean-related lists